The term carder bee is a popular name applied to various bees, including:
 the common carder bee Bombus pascuorum, a European bumblebee
 also Bombus humilis, Bombus muscorum, Bombus ruderarius and Bombus sylvarum
 the European wool carder bee Anthidium manicatum, and
 other members of the family Megachilidae which collect plant or animal hairs and fibers

Animal common name disambiguation pages